QBR may refer to:

 Total quarterback rating, an American football performance measurement
 Quins-Bobbies Rugby Club, in South Africa
 Queenborough railway station, North Kent, National Rail station code
 QBR: The Black Book Review, later merged into the Black Issues Book Review